Rajesh Khera  (Rājēśa Khērā) is an Indian television actor and voice actor who  has acted in many Hindi films and is remembered for the role of fashion designer Maddy in Jassi Jaissi Koi Nahin. He was recently seen as a contender in a TV reality show Survivor (2011) which aired on Star Plus.

He played the role of Acharya Devvrat in the TV serial Chakravartin Ashoka Samrat.

Filmography

Films

 Josh (2000) as Matwyn
 Hazaar Chaurasi (from Kashmir)
 Hazaar Chaurasi Ki Maa (1998)
 Hu Tu Tu (1999)
 Taal (1999) as Brij Mohan Mehta
 Tum Bin (2001) as Shekhar's Friend
 23rd March 1931: Shaheed (2002) as Sardar Ajit Singh
 Om Jai Jagadish (2002) as Fake Audio CD manufacturer 
 Jaal: The Trap (2003) as Journalist Alok Dass (Ajay's Friend)
 Samay (2003)
 Naach (2004)
 Karam (2005) as Bull
 Tango Charlie (2005) as BSF soldier Sangraam Singh
 The Train (2007)
 Chain Kulii Ki Main Kulii (2007) as Hitler
 Victoria No. 203 (2007) as Karan
 Speed (2007) as Taxi Driver
 Kambakkht Ishq (2009) as Dr. Ali
 Aagey Se Right (2009) as T.V. Vinod
 Lamhaa (2010) as Parvez
 Mallika (2010)as Chandar
 The Whisperers
 42 km as Ramesh
 Yeh Dooriyan (2011) as Vishal
 U R My Jaan (2011)
 Hate Story 2 (2014)
 Ek Kahani Julie Ki (2016)
Satyameva Jayate (2018) as Police Inspector Satish Bhonsale
 Thackeray (film) (2019) as Morarji Desai

Television

Web series

Dubbing career
Rajesh has also been dubbing for foreign films into the Hindi language as well, in addition to acting, while working as a production trainee.

Dubbing roles

Live action films

References

Notes

c. He has a niece whose name is Anika Lakhanpal

External links

1968 births
Indian male television actors
Living people
Indian male voice actors
21st-century Indian male actors
Place of birth missing (living people)
Actors from Mumbai